The 2015 World Match Racing Tour was a series of match racing sailing regattas staged during 2015–16 season.

Ian Williams won the tour, his sixth title, by defeating Taylor Canfield in the final of Monsoon Cup.

Regattas

Standings

References

2015-16
2015 in sailing
2016 in sailing